SC Genemuiden is an association football club from Genemuiden, Netherlands.

History
The club was founded on October 22, 1930, and has played exclusively at amateur level in all its history. Genemuiden was part of the Hoofdklasse league in the 2009–10 season, which they completed in fifth place in the Saturday C group, then winning promotion to the newly established Topklasse league for the inaugural 2010–11 season through playoffs. After being relegated in 2012–13 to the Hoofdklasse, they returned to the Topklasse by winning the Saturday C title the next season.

In the 2021–22 season, Genemuiden qualified for the promotion playoffs, but lost 3–2 on aggregate to SC Feyenoord in the first round.

References

External links 
 Official site

Football clubs in the Netherlands
Association football clubs established in 1930
1930 establishments in the Netherlands
Football clubs in Overijssel
Zwartewaterland